Hot in Cleveland is an American sitcom that premiered on June 16, 2010, on TV Land. The series is TV Land’s first venture into sitcoms. The premiere episode was the most-watched telecast in the network’s history. Hot in Cleveland is produced by Sean Hayes' Hazy Mills Productions and shot with a multicamera setup in front of a live studio audience at CBS Studio Center.

A total of 128 episodes of Hot in Cleveland were produced over six seasons, between June 16, 2010 and June 3, 2015.

Series overview

Episodes

Season 1 (2010)

Season 2 (2011)

Season 3 (2011–12)

Season 4 (2012–13)

Season 5 (2014)

Season 6 (2014–15)

Specials

References 

General references

External links 
 Official episode guide at TV Land

Hot in Cleveland
Lists of American sitcom episodes